Musgravea stenostachya, commonly known as the crater oak or grey silky oak, is a species of rainforest tree of the family Proteaceae from north-eastern Queensland. It was described in 1890 by Ferdinand von Mueller, having been collected on Mount Bellenden-Ker.

References

Proteaceae
Endemic flora of Queensland
Proteales of Australia
Taxa named by Ferdinand von Mueller